The Tampa Bay Rays 2017 season was the Rays' 20th season of Major League Baseball, and the tenth as the "Rays" (all at Tropicana Field). Although they improved upon their record from last season, they still finished in third place in the American League East and did not make the playoffs.

Season standings

American League East

American League Wild Card

Record against opponents

Regular season summary

Game log

|-style="background:#cfc"
| 1 || April 2 || Yankees || 7–3 || Archer (1–0) || Tanaka (0–1) || Colomé (1) || 31,042 || 1–0 || W1
|-style="background:#fbb"
| 2 || April 4 || Yankees || 0–5 || Sabathia (1–0) || Odorizzi (0–1) || — || 19,366 || 1–1 || L1
|-style="background:#cfc"
| 3 || April 5 || Yankees || 4–1 || Cobb (1–0) || Pineda (0–1) || Colomé (2) || 12,737 || 2–1 || W1
|-style="background:#fbb"
| 4 || April 6 || Blue Jays || 2–5 || Stroman (1–0) || Snell (0–1) || Grilli (1) || 12,678 || 2–2 || L1
|-style="background:#cfc"
| 5 || April 7 || Blue Jays || 10–8 || Cedeño (1–0) || Howell (0–1) || Colomé (3) || 12,842 || 3–2 || W1
|-style="background:#cfc"
| 6 || April 8 || Blue Jays || 3–2  || Ramírez (1–0) || Lawrence (0–1) || — || 21,838 || 4–2 || W2
|-style="background:#cfc"
| 7 || April 9 || Blue Jays || 7–2 || Odorizzi (1–1) || Estrada (0–1) || — || 15,341 || 5–2 || W3
|-style="background:#fbb"
| 8 || April 10 || @ Yankees || 1–8 || Pineda (1–1) || Cobb (1–1) || — || 46,955 || 5–3 || L1
|-style="background:#fbb"
| 9 || April 12 || @ Yankees || 4–8 || Mitchell (1–0) || Díaz (0–1) || Chapman (1) || 38,002 || 5–4 || L2
|-style="background:#fbb"
| 10 || April 13 || @ Yankees || 2–3 || Severino (1–0) || Cedeño (1–1) || Chapman (2) || 34,772 || 5–5 || L3
|-style="background:#cfc"
| 11 || April 14 || @ Red Sox || 10–5 || Archer (2–0) || Porcello (1–1) || — || 36,813 || 6–5 || W1
|-style="background:#fbb"
| 12 || April 15 || @ Red Sox || 1–2 || Sale (1–1) || Hunter (0–1) || Kimbrel (4) || 36,686 || 6–6 || L1
|-style="background:#fbb"
| 13 || April 16 || @ Red Sox || 5–7 || Kelly (2–0) || Farquhar (0–1) || Kimbrel (5) || 36,209 || 6–7 || L2
|-style="background:#fbb"
| 14 || April 17 || @ Red Sox || 3–4 || Wright (1–1) || Snell (0–2) || Kimbrel (6) || 37,318 || 6–8 || L3
|-style="background:#cfc"
| 15 || April 18 || Tigers || 5–1 || Andriese (1–0) || Fulmer (1–1) || — || 16,265 || 7–8 || W1
|-style="background:#cfc"
| 16 || April 19 || Tigers || 8–7 || Pruitt (1–0) || Rodríguez (1–1) || — || 12,281 || 8–8 || W2
|-style="background:#cfc"
| 17 || April 20 || Tigers || 8–1 || Ramírez (2–0) || Norris (1–1) || — || 13,267 || 9–8 || W3
|-style="background:#fbb"
| 18 || April 21 || Astros || 3–6 || Feliz (1–0) || Cobb (1–2) || Giles (4) || 17,683 || 9–9 || L1
|-style="background:#cfc"
| 19 || April 22 || Astros || 6–3 || Pruitt (2–0) || Morton (1–2) || Colomé (4) || 17,008 || 10–9 || W1
|-style="background:#fbb"
| 20 || April 23 || Astros || 4–6  || Gregerson (1–1) || Garton (0–1) || Giles (5) || 15,548 || 10–10 || L1
|-style="background:#fbb"
| 21 || April 24 || @ Orioles || 3–6 || Givens (3–0) || Archer (2–1) || Brach (4) || 11,142 || 10–11 || L2
|-style="background:#cfc"
| 22 || April 25 || @ Orioles || 2–0 || Whitley (1–0) || Miley (1–1) || Colomé (5) || 11,472 || 11–11 || W1
|-style="background:#fbb"
| 23 || April 26 || @ Orioles || 4–5  || Asher (1–0) || Colomé (0–1) || — || 16,289 || 11–12 || L1
|-style="background:#cfc"
| 24 || April 28 || @ Blue Jays || 7–4 || Pruitt (3–0) || Grilli (1–3) || Whitley (1) || 36,256 || 12–12 || W1
|-style="background:#fbb"
| 25 || April 29 || @ Blue Jays || 1–4 || Liriano (2–2) || Andriese (1–1) || Osuna (2) || 42,419 || 12–13 || L1
|-style="background:#fbb"
| 26 || April 30 || @ Blue Jays || 1–3 || Howell (1–1) || Colomé (0–2) || Osuna (3) || 42,986 || 12–14 || L2
|-

|-style="background:#cfc"
| 27 || May 1 || @ Marlins || 4–2 || Farquhar (1–1) || Ziegler (1–1) || Colomé (6) || 16,096 || 13–14 || W1
|-style="background:#cfc"
| 28 || May 2 || @ Marlins || 3–1 || Cobb (2–2) || Vólquez (0–4) || Colomé (7) || 16,011 || 14–14 || W2
|-style="background:#fbb"
| 29 || May 3 || Marlins || 6–10 || Conley (2–2) || Pruitt (3–1) || — || 12,285 || 14–15 || L1
|-style="background:#cfc"
| 30 || May 4 || Marlins || 5–1 || Andriese (2–1) || Straily (1–3) || Colomé (8) || 10,118 || 15–15 || W1
|-style="background:#fbb"
| 31 || May 5 || Blue Jays || 4–8 || Loup (1–0) || Díaz (0–2) || — || 12,461 || 15–16 || L1
|-style="background:#cfc"
| 32 || May 6 || Blue Jays || 6–1 || Odorizzi (2–1) || Estrada (1–2) || — || 12,035 || 16–16 || W1
|-style="background:#fbb"
| 33 || May 7 || Blue Jays || 1–2 || Tepera (2–1) || Cobb (2–3) || Osuna (4) || 15,068 || 16–17 || L1
|-style="background:#fbb"
| 34 || May 8 || Royals || 3–7 || Karns (2–2) || Snell (0–3) || — || 12,826 || 16–18 || L2
|-style="background:#fbb"
| 35 || May 9 || Royals || 6–7  || Junis (1–0) || Moreno (0–1) || Herrera (5) || 9,921 || 16–19 || L3
|-style="background:#cfc"
| 36 || May 10 || Royals || 12–1 || Archer (3–1) || Hammel (1–4) || — || 9,320 || 17–19 || W1
|-style="background:#fbb"
| 37 || May 11 || Royals || 0–6 || Vargas (5–1) || Odorizzi (2–2) || — || 9,340 || 17–20 || L1
|-style="background:#cfc"
| 38 || May 12 || @ Red Sox || 5–4 || Cobb (3–3) || Porcello (2–5) || Colomé (9) || 36,496 || 18–20 || W1
|-style="background:#fbb"
| 39 || May 13 || @ Red Sox || 3–6 || Sale (4–2) || Snell (0–4) || Kimbrel (11) || 35,447 || 18–21 || L1
|-style="background:#cfc"
| 40 || May 14 || @ Red Sox || 11–2 || Andriese (3–1) || Pomeranz (3–3) || — || 35,080 || 19–21 || W1
|-style="background:#fbb"
| 41 || May 15 || @ Indians || 7–8 || Logan (1–0) || Archer (3–2) || Allen (10) || 14,613 || 19–22 || L1
|-style="background:#cfc"
| 42 || May 16 || @ Indians || 6–4 || Odorizzi (3–2) || Salazar (2–4) || Colomé (10) || 18,238 || 20–22 || W1
|-style="background:#cfc"
| 43 || May 17 || @ Indians || 7–4 || Cobb (4–3) || Tomlin (2–5) ||  —|| 22,104 || 21–22 || W2
|-style="background:#cfc"
| 44 || May 19 || Yankees || 5–4 || Farquhar (2–1) || Clippard (0–2) || Colomé (11) || 21,146 || 22–22 || W3
|-style="background:#cfc"
| 45 || May 20 || Yankees || 9–5 || Andriese (4–1) || Tanaka (5–3) || — || 22,864 || 23–22 || W4
|-style="background:#fbb"
| 46 || May 21 || Yankees || 2–3 || Sabathia (4–2) || Archer (3–3) || Betances (2) || 20,873 || 23–23 || L1
|-style="background:#fbb"
| 47 || May 22 || Angels || 2–3 || Ramírez (4–3) || Díaz (0–3) || Norris (9) || 12,249 || 23–24 || L2
|-style="background:#fbb"
| 48 || May 23 || Angels || 0–4 || Shoemaker (4–2) || Cobb (4–4) || — || 9,014 || 23–25 || L3
|-style="background:#cfc"
| 49 || May 24 || Angels || 5–2 || Ramírez (3–0) || Nolasco (2–4) || Colomé (12) || 9,975 || 24–25 || W1
|-style="background:#cfc"
| 50 || May 25 || Angels || 4–0 || Andriese (5–1) || Wright (0–1) || — || 9,459 || 25–25 || W2
|-style="background:#cfc"
| 51 || May 26 || @ Twins || 5–2 || Archer (4–3) || Santiago (4–3) || Colomé (13) || 20,949 || 26–25 || W3
|-style="background:#fbb"
| 52 || May 27 || @ Twins || 3–5 || Rogers (2–1) || Farquhar (2–2) || Kintzler (13) || 27,530 || 26–26 || L1
|-style="background:#cfc"
| 53 || May 28 || @ Twins || 8–6  || Colomé (1–2) || Santiago (4–4) || Ramírez (1) || 28,951 || 27–26 || W1
|-style="background:#cfc"
| 54 || May 29 || @ Rangers || 10–8 || De León (1–0) || Barnette (1–1) || Colomé (14) || 35,914 || 28–26 || W2
|-style="background:#fbb"
| 55 || May 30 || @ Rangers || 5–9 || Kela (2–1) || Whitley (1–1) || — || 22,942 || 28–27 || L1
|-style="background:#cfc"
| 56 || May 31 || @ Rangers || 7–5  || Pruitt (4–1) || Dyson (1–6) || Colomé (15) || 24,410 || 29–27 || W1
|-

|-style="background:#fbb"
| 57 || June 2 || @ Mariners || 4–12 || Bergman (3–2) || Odorizzi (3–3) || — || 27,933 || 29–28 || L1
|-style="background:#fbb"
| 58 || June 3 || @ Mariners || 2–9 || Gaviglio (2–1) || Cobb (4–5) || — || 26,995 || 29–29 || L2
|-style="background:#fbb"
| 59 || June 4 || @ Mariners || 1–7 || Miranda (6–2) || Ramírez (3–1) || — || 28,579 || 29–30 || L3
|-style="background:#fbb"
| 60 || June 6 || White Sox || 2–4 || Beck (1–0) || Archer (4–4) || Robertson (9) || 14,590 || 29–31 || L4
|-style="background:#cfc"
| 61 || June 7 || White Sox || 3–1 || Faria (1–0) || Pelfrey (2–5) || Colomé (16) || 9,313 || 30–31 || W1
|-style="background:#cfc"
| 62 || June 8 || White Sox || 7–5 || Odorizzi (4–3) || Holland (4–6) || Colomé (17) || 8,971 || 31–31 || W2
|-style="background:#cfc"
| 63 || June 9 || Athletics || 13–4 || Cobb (5–5) || Triggs (5–6) || — || 13,153 || 32–31 || W3
|-style="background:#cfc"
| 64 || June 10  || Athletics || 6–5  || Pruitt (5–1) || Hendriks (2–1) || — || 17,775 || 33–31 || W4
|-style="background:#fcc"
| 65 || June 10  || Athletics || 2–7 || Manaea (6–3) || Hu (0–1) || — || 17,775 || 33–32 || L1
|-style="background:#cfc"
| 66 || June 11 || Athletics || 5–4 || Whitley (2–1) || Coulombe (0–1) || Colomé (18) || 13,640 || 34–32 || W1
|-style="background:#cfc"
| 67 || June 13 || @ Blue Jays || 8–1 || Faria (2–0) || Estrada (4–5) || — || 39,404 || 35–32 || W2
|-style="background:#fcc"
| 68 || June 14 || @ Blue Jays || 6–7 || Smith (3–0) || Alvarado (0–1) || Osuna (17) || 37,734 || 35–33 || L1
|-style="background:#fcc"
| 69 || June 15 || @ Tigers || 3–5 || Wilson (3–2) || Hunter (0–2) || — || 24,056 || 35–34 || L2
|-style="background:#fcc"
| 70 || June 16 || @ Tigers || 4–13 || Norris (4–4) || Ramírez (3–2) || — || 29,674 || 35–35 || L3
|-style="background:#cfc"
| 71 || June 17 || @ Tigers || 3–2 || Archer (5–4) || Fulmer (6–5) || Colomé (19) || 33,478 || 36–35 || W1
|-style="background:#cfc"
| 72 || June 18 || @ Tigers || 9–1 || Faria (3–0) || Farmer (2–1) || — || 36,442 || 37–35 || W2
|-style="background:#fcc"
| 73 || June 19 || Reds || 3–7 || Lorenzen (4–2) || Alvarado (0–2) || — || 17,117 || 37–36 || L1
|-style="background:#cfc"
| 74 || June 20 || Reds || 6–5 || Cobb (6–5) || Garrett (3–6) || Colomé (20) || 13,375 || 38–36 || W1
|-style="background:#cfc"
| 75 || June 21 || Reds || 8–3 || Ramírez (4–2) || Adleman (4–4) || Whitley (2) || 19,619 || 39–36 || W2
|-style="background:#cfc"
| 76 || June 23 || Orioles || 15–5 || Archer (6–4) || Jiménez (2–3) || Pruitt (1) || 18,929 || 40–36 || W3 
|-style="background:#fcc"
| 77 || June 24 || Orioles || 3–8 || Bundy (8–6) || Alvarado (0–3) || — || 23,902 || 40–37 || L1
|-style="background:#fcc"
| 78 || June 25 || Orioles || 5–8 || Brach (2–1) || Colomé (1–3) || — || 15,943 || 40–38 || L2
|-style="background:#cfc"
| 79 || June 27 || @ Pirates || 4–2  || Colomé (2–3) || Rivero (3–2) || Hunter (1) || 20,424 || 41–38 || W1
|-style="background:#fcc"
| 80 || June 28 || @ Pirates || 2–6 || Nova (8–5) || Snell (0–5) || — || 21,582 || 41–39 || L1
|-style="background:#fcc"
| 81 || June 29 || @ Pirates || 0–4 || Taillon (4–2) || Archer (6–5) || — || 22,595 || 41–40 || L2
|-style="background:#cfc"
| 82 || June 30 || @ Orioles || 6–4  || Díaz (1–3) || O'Day (1–2) || Colomé (21) || 24,398 || 42–40 || W1
|-

|-style="background:#cfc"
| 83 || July 1 || @ Orioles || 10–3 || Odorizzi (5–3) || Bundy (8–7) || — || 28,346 || 43–40 || W2
|-style="background:#fcc"
| 84 || July 2 || @ Orioles || 1–7 || Gausman (5–7) || Cobb (6–6) || — || 26,489 || 43–41 || L1
|-style="background:#cfc"
| 85 || July 4 || @ Cubs || 6–5 || Archer (7–5) || Lester (5–5) || Colomé (22) || 42,046 || 44–41 || W1
|-style="background:#fcc"
| 86 || July 5 || @ Cubs || 3–7 || Strop (3–2) || Ramírez (4–3) || — || 39,855 || 44–42 || L1
|-style="background:#cfc"
| 87 || July 6 || Red Sox || 4–1 || Faria (4–0) || Sale (11–4) || Colomé (23) || 23,375 || 45–42 || W1
|-style="background:#fcc"
| 88 || July 7 || Red Sox || 3–8 || Pomeranz (9–4) || Odorizzi (5–4) || — || 24,842 || 45–43 || L1
|-style="background:#cfc"
| 89 || July 8 || Red Sox || 1–0 || Cobb (7–6) || Porcello (4–11) || Colomé (24) || 23,419 || 46–43 || W1
|-style="background:#cfc"
| 90 || July 9 || Red Sox || 5–3 || Boxberger (1–0) || Kelly (3–1) || Colomé (25) || 20,812 || 47–43 || W2
|- style="text-align:center; background:#bbcaff;"
| colspan="10" | 88th All-Star Game in Miami, Florida
|-style="background:#cfc"
| 91 || July 14 || @ Angels || 2–1  || Boxberger (1–1) || Bedrosian (2–1) || Colomé (26) || 38,119 || 48–43 || W3
|-style="background:#cfc"
| 92 || July 15 || @ Angels || 6–3 || Cobb (8–6) || Ramírez (8–8) || — || 38,515 || 49–43 || W4
|-style="background:#fcc"
| 93 || July 16 || @ Angels || 3–4 || Hernandez (1–0) || Díaz (1–4) || Norris (14) || 36,178 || 49–44 || L1
|-style="background:#cfc"
| 94 || July 17 || @ Athletics || 3–2 || Odorizzi (6–4) || Gossett (1–5) || Colomé (27) || 9,736 || 50–44 || W1
|-style="background:#cfc"
| 95 || July 18 || @ Athletics || 4–3 || Kolarek (1–0) || Casilla (2–4) || Colomé (28) || 15,231 || 51–44 || W2
|-style="background:#fcc"
| 96 || July 19 || @ Athletics || 2–7 || Gray (6–4) || Faria (4–1) || — || 17,019 || 51–45 || L1
|-style="background:#fcc"
| 97 || July 21 || Rangers || 3–4  || Claudio (2–0) || Boxberger (2–1) || — || 24,461 || 51–46 || L2
|-style="background:#fcc"
| 98 || July 22 || Rangers || 3–4 || Cashner (5–8) || Archer (7–6) || Claudio (4) || 20,568 || 51–47 || L3
|-style="background:#fcc"
| 99 || July 23 || Rangers || 5–6 || Bush (3–4) || Boxberger (2–2) || Leclerc (2) || 16,954 || 51–48 || L4
|-style="background:#fcc"
| 100 || July 24 || Orioles || 0–5 || Gausman (7–7) || Snell (0–6) || — || 15,187 || 51–49 || L5
|-style="background:#cfc"
| 101 || July 25 || Orioles || 5–4 || Faria (5–1) || Miley (4–9) || Colomé (29) || 12,471 || 52–49 || W1
|-style="background:#cfc"
| 102 || July 26 || Orioles || 5–1 || Cobb (9–6) || Jiménez (4–7) || — || 18,430 || 53–49 || W2
|-style="background:#fcc"
| 103 || July 27 || @ Yankees || 5–6  || Chapman (3–1) || Kittredge (0–1) || — || 44,033 || 53–50 || L1
|-style="background:#fcc"
| 104 || July 28 || @ Yankees || 1–6 || Tanaka (8–9) || Pruitt (5–2) || — || 40,470 || 53–51 || L2
|-style="background:#fcc"
| 105 || July 29 || @ Yankees || 4–5 || Chapman (4–1) || Boxberger (2–3) || — || 43,015 || 53–52 || L3
|-style="background:#cfc"
| 106 || July 30 || @ Yankees || 5–3 || Cishek (2–1) || Montgomery (7–6) || Colomé (30) || 41,547  || 54–52 || W1
|-style="background:#fcc"
| 107 || July 31 || @ Astros || 7–14 || Morton (9–4) || Cobb (9–7) || — || 24,154 || 54–53 || L1
|-

|-style="background:#cfc"
| 108 || August 1 || @ Astros || 6–4 || Archer (8–6) || Fiers (7–6) || Colomé (31) || 22,985 || 55–53 || W1
|-style="background:#cfc"
| 109 || August 2 || @ Astros || 3–0 || Pruitt (6–2) || Keuchel (9–1) || Colomé (32) || 26,722 || 56–53 || W2
|-style="background:#cfc"
| 110 || August 3 || @ Astros || 5–3 || Boxberger (3–3) || Liriano (6–6) || Colomé (33) || 23,404 || 57–53 || W3
|-style="background:#fcc"
| 111 || August 4 || Brewers || 0–2 || Woodruff (1–0) || Faria (5–2) || Knebel (21) || 21,164  || 57–54 || L1
|-style="background:#fcc"
| 112 || August 5 || Brewers || 0–3 || Davies (13–5) || Cobb (9–8) || Swarzak (2) || 15,849 || 57–55 || L2
|-style="background:#cfc"
| 113 || August 6 || Brewers || 2–1 || Hunter (1–2) || Barnes (3–3) || — || 12,129 || 58–55 || W1
|-style="background:#fcc"
| 114 || August 8 || Red Sox || 0–2 || Sale (14–4) || Pruitt (6–3) || Kimbrel (28) || 22,328 || 58–56 || L1
|-style="background:#fcc"
| 115 || August 9 || Red Sox || 2–8 || Porcello (6–14) || Odorizzi (6–5) || — || 11,853 || 58–57 || L2
|-style="background:#cfc"
| 116 || August 10 || Indians || 4–1 || Hunter (2–2) || Goody (1–2) || Colomé (34) || 9,533 || 59–57 || W1
|-style="background:#fcc"
| 117 || August 11 || Indians || 0–5 || Carrasco (11–5) || Faria (5–3) || — || 16,794 || 59–58 || L1
|-style="background:#fcc"
| 118 || August 12 || Indians || 0–3 || Clevinger (6–4) || Archer (8–7) || Allen (20) || 22,024 || 59–59 || L2
|-style="background:#fcc"
| 119 || August 13 || Indians || 3–4 || Kluber (11–3) || Hunter (2–3) || Allen (21) || 17,775 || 59–60 || L3
|-style="background:#fcc"
| 120 || August 14 || @ Blue Jays || 1–2 || Tepesch (1–2) || Odorizzi (6–6) || Osuna (30) || 32,151 || 59–61 || L4
|-style="background:#cfc"
| 121 || August 15 || @ Blue Jays || 6–4 || Snell (1–6) || Estrada (5–8) || Colomé (35) || 33,178 || 60–61 || W1
|-style="background:#fcc"
| 122 || August 16 || @ Blue Jays || 2–3 || Stroman (11–6) || Faria (5–4) || Osuna (31) || 36,784 || 60–62 || L1
|-style="background:#fcc"
| 123 || August 17 || @ Blue Jays || 3–5 || Leone (3–0) || Hunter (2–4) || Osuna (32) || 46,855 || 60–63 || L2
|-style="background:#fcc"
| 124 || August 18 || Mariners || 1–7 || Ramírez (5–4) || Pruitt (6–4) || — || 11,501 || 60–64 || L3
|-style="background:#fcc"
| 125 || August 19 || Mariners || 6–7 || Miranda (8–6) || Odorizzi (6–7) || Díaz (27) || 12,218 || 60–65 || L4
|-style="background:#cfc"
| 126 || August 20 || Mariners || 3–0 || Snell (2–6) || Gallardo (5–9) || Colomé (36) || 13,354 || 61–65 || W1
|-style="background:#cfc"
| 127 || August 22 || Blue Jays || 6–5 || Archer (9–7) || Rowley (1–1) || Colomé (37) || 11,948 || 62–65 || W2
|-style="background:#fcc"
| 128 || August 23 || Blue Jays || 6–7 || Tepera (7–1) || Hunter (2–5) || Osuna (33) || 8,264 || 62–66 || L1
|-style="background:#cfc"
| 129 || August 24 || Blue Jays || 2–0 || Cishek (3–1) || Koehler (1–6)  || Colomé (38) || 10,133 || 63–66 || W1
|-style="background:#cfc"
| 130 || August 25 || @ Cardinals || 7–3 || Romo (2–1) || Wacha (9–7) || — || 40,050 || 64–66 || W2
|-style="background:#fcc"
| 131 || August 26 || @ Cardinals || 4–6 || Lyons (2–0) || Boxberger (3–4) || || 41,295 || 64–67 || L1
|-style="background:#cfc"
| 132 || August 27 || @ Cardinals || 3–2  || Romo (3–1) || Tuivailala (3–3) || Colomé (39) || 44,469 || 65–67 || W1
|-style="background:#cfc"
| 133 || August 28 || @ Royals || 12–0 || Pruitt (7–3) || Kennedy (4–10) || Andriese (1) || 21,866 || 66–67 || W2
|-style="background:#fcc"
| 134 || August 29 || @ Royals || 2–6 || Junis (6–2) || Cobb (9–9) || — || 25,204 || 66–68 || L1
|-style="background:#cfc"
| 135 || August 30 || @ Royals || 5–3 || Odorizzi (7–7) || Vargas (14–9) || Colomé (40) || 25,916 || 67–68 || W1
|-

|-style="background:#cfc"
| 136 || September 1 || @ White Sox || 3–1 || Snell (3–6) || López (0–2) || Colomé (41) || 13,585 || 68–68 || W2
|-style="background:#fcc"
| 137 || September 2 || @ White Sox || 4–5 || Fulmer (1–1) || Archer (9–8) || Minaya (4) || 17,700 || 68–69 || L1 
|-style="background:#fcc"
| 138 || September 3 || @ White Sox || 2–6 || Giolito (2–1) || Andriese (5–2) || — || 17,633 || 68–70 || L2 
|-style="background:#cfc"
| 139 || September 4 || Twins || 11–4 || Cobb (10–9) || Berríos (12–7) || — || 12,108 || 69–70 || W1 
|-style="background:#cfc"
| 140 || September 5 || Twins || 2–1 || Odorizzi (8–7) || Colón (6–11)  || Colomé (42) || 6,509 || 70–70 || W2
|-style="background:#fcc"
| 141 || September 6 || Twins || 6–10 || Rogers (6–3) || Cishek (3–2) || — || 7,185 || 70–71 || L1
|-style="background:#fcc"
| 142 || September 8 || @ Red Sox || 3–9 || Pomeranz (15–5) || Archer (9–9) || — || 34,781 || 70–72 || L2
|-style="background:#fcc"
| 143 || September 9 || @ Red Sox || 0–9 || Sale (16–7) || Andriese (5–3) || — || 36,734 || 70–73 || L3
|-style="background:#cfc"
| 144 || September 10 || @ Red Sox || 4–1 || Cobb (11–9) || Porcello (9–17) || Colomé (43) || 35,859 || 71–73 || W1
|-style="background:#fcc"
| 145 || September 11 || Yankees || 1–5 || Robertson (8–2) || Odorizzi (8–8) || — || 15,327 || 71–74 || L1
|-style="background:#cfc"
| 146 || September 12 || Yankees || 2–1 || Hunter (3–5) || Gray (9–10) || Colomé (44) || 21,024 || 72–74 || W1
|-style="background:#fcc"
| 147 || September 13 || Yankees || 2–3 || Green (5–0) || Archer (9–10) || Chapman (18) || 13,159 || 72–75 || L1
|-style="background:#fcc"
| 148 || September 15 || Red Sox || 6–13  || Workman (1–1) || Pruitt (7–4) || — || 16,006 || 72–76 || L2
|-style="background:#fcc"
| 149 || September 16 || Red Sox || 1–3 || Porcello (10–17) || Cobb (11–10) || Kimbrel (33) || 14,942 || 72–77 || L3
|-style="background:#cfc"
| 150 || September 17 || Red Sox || 3–2 || Odorizzi (9–8) || Rodríguez (5–6) || Colomé (45) || 14,936 || 73–77 || W1
|-style="background:#fcc"
| 151 || September 19 || Cubs || 1–2 || Montgomery (7–8) || Archer (9–11) || Davis (32) || 25,046 || 73–78 || L1
|-style="background:#cfc"
| 152 || September 20 || Cubs || 8–1 || Snell (4–6) || Lester (11–8) || — || 24,238 || 74–78 || W1
|-style="background:#fcc"
| 153 || September 21 || @ Orioles || 1–3 || Ynoa (2–2) || Andriese (5–4) || Brach (18) || 14,697 || 74–79 || L1
|-style="background:#cfc"
| 154 || September 22 || @ Orioles || 8–3 || Cobb (12–10) || Jiménez (6–11) || — || 28,835 || 75–79 || W1
|-style="background:#cfc"
| 155 || September 23 || @ Orioles || 9–6 || Odorizzi (10–8) || Hellickson (8–11) || Colomé (46) || 42,802 || 76–79 || W2
|-style="background:#fcc"
| 156 || September 24 || @ Orioles || 4–9 || Givens (8–1) || Archer (9–12) || — || 23,424 || 76–80 || L1
|-style="background:#fcc"
| 157 || September 26 || @ Yankees || 1–6 || Montgomery (9–7) || Snell (4–7) || — || 30,434 || 76–81 || L2
|-style="background:#fcc"
| 158 || September 27 || @ Yankees || 1–6 || Severino (14–6) || Andriese (5–5) || — || 30,549 || 76–82 || L3
|-style="background:#cfc"
| 159 || September 28 || @ Yankees || 9–6 || Hu (1–1) || Gray (10–12) || — || 32,933 || 77–82 || W1
|-style="background:#cfc"
| 160 || September 29 || Orioles || 7–0 || Boxberger (4–4) || Miley (8–15) || — || 21,142 || 78–82 || W2
|-style="background:#cfc"
| 161 || September 30 || Orioles || 4–3 || Archer (10–12) || Castro (3–3) || Colomé (47) || 15,416 || 79–82 || W3
|-style="background:#cfc"
| 162 || October 1 || Orioles || 6–0 || Snell (5–7) || Gausman (11–12) || — || 16,018 || 80–82 || W4
|-

|- style="text-align:center;"
| Legend:       = Win       = Loss       = PostponementBold = Rays team member

Roster

Farm system

References

External links
2017 Tampa Bay Rays season Official Site 
2017 Tampa Bay Rays season at ESPN
2017 Tampa Bay Rays season at Baseball Reference

Tampa Bay Rays season
Tampa Bay Rays
Tampa Bay Rays seasons